Flexopecten felipponei is a species of saltwater scallop, a marine bivalve mollusk in the family Pectinidae, the scallops.

Original description 
The species Flexopecten felipponei was originally described as Pecten (Chlamys) felipponei by W. H. Dall in 1922.

The type locality is Mar de la Plata, Argentina.

Dall's original text (the type description) reads as follows:

References

External links

Pectinidae
Molluscs described in 1922